Khuwaled Al-Harthi is a Saudi Arabian sport shooter. He competed in the 1984 Summer Olympics.

References

Living people
Shooters at the 1984 Summer Olympics
Saudi Arabian male sport shooters
Olympic shooters of Saudi Arabia
Year of birth missing (living people)